Ctenucha ruficeps is a moth of the family Erebidae. It was described by Francis Walker in 1854. It is found in Mexico.

References

ruficeps
Moths described in 1854